The 2015 Slovenian Supercup, known as Superpokal Telekom Slovenije 2015 due to sponsorship reasons, was the eleventh edition of the Slovenian Supercup, an annual football match contested by the winners of the previous season's Slovenian PrvaLiga and Slovenian Cup competitions. The match was played on 5 July 2015 at the Bonifika Stadium in Koper between the 2014–15 Slovenian Cup winners Koper and the 2014–15 Slovenian PrvaLiga winners Maribor.

Match details

See also
2015–16 Slovenian PrvaLiga
2015–16 Slovenian Cup

References

External links
Slovenian Supercup

Slovenian Supercup
Supercup
Slovenian Supercup 2015
Slovenian Supercup 2015